Águilas Doradas is a professional Colombian football team based in Rionegro that currently plays in the Categoría Primera A. They play their home games at Alberto Grisales stadium. The club also has a futsal team.

History
On 16 July 2008, the club was founded as Itagüí Ditaires after a group of investors led by former football player José Fernando Salazar bought the team Bajo Cauca and relocated it to Itagüí. 

Itagüí began playing in the Primera B's 2008 Finalización championship, where they finished sixth out of nine teams in their group. In the 2009 Apertura, Itagüí had a great performance; they finished second in their group during the regular season, then won their group in the playoffs, before losing the final to Cortuluá on penalties. In the 2009 Finalización, the club had the most points out of all 18 in the regular season, with 33, and were serious candidates to win the title. However, they faltered in the playoffs and finished last with only three points. For the 2010 season DIMAYOR changed the Primera B format to a year-long tournament. Itagüí topped the regular season table, advancing to the playoffs. In the playoffs, they won their group, winning five and only losing one, which qualified them for the final against Deportivo Pasto. In the finals, the club won 3–2 on aggregate, becoming champions and being promoted to the Primera A, mainly with the help of Luis Páez, who scored in both legs. In that same year, the club also reached the Copa Colombia finals, knocking Deportes Tolima, Atlético Nacional, and Millonarios out of the competition successively before losing to Deportivo Cali.

They made their Primera A debut in 2011, being the first time in the top-flight that four teams from the same department (Antioquia) competed for the grand prize.

The club was expelled from Itagüí in May 2014, following a dispute between the club's chairman and the city's mayor regarding the financial support received by the club from Itagüí's local government. The decision to expel the club from the city was made by the mayor after being publicly criticized by the club's chairman for the scarce support provided to the club. This incident meant the team would change its name to Águilas Pereira, moving to the city of Pereira and playing its home matches at Hernán Ramírez Villegas stadium, a change approved by DIMAYOR's Assembly in an extraordinary meeting on 14 July 2014. 

In March 2015, the club moved to Rionegro, changing its name to Águilas Doradas, citing economic losses as the main reason. On 5 January 2016 the club announced it would be changing its name to Rionegro Águilas and its kit colour would be switched from its traditional golden to red. The club returned to its usual primary kit colours of golden and black for the 2020 season.

In April 2021, the club made world headlines when they were forced to play a league match with Boyacá Chicó using only seven players due to a rule imposed by DIMAYOR in the context of the COVID-19 pandemic, which stated that a team had to play if they had at least seven players available. Águilas Doradas were unable to field an entire team due to fifteen players testing positive for COVID-19 and seven players out injured. As a result, the club sent a request to DIMAYOR to have the match postponed, which was declined. Eventually the game was called off after a player got injured with ten minutes remaining, leaving the team with only six players and below the minimum needed.

Honours

Categoría Primera B
Winners (1): 2010
Copa Colombia
Runners-up (1): 2010

Players

First-team squad

Managers

Source: Worldfootball.net

See also
 Águilas Doradas (futsal)

References

External links
 Official website
 Aguilas Doradas at DIMAYOR.com

Football clubs in Colombia
Association football clubs established in 2008
2008 establishments in Colombia
Categoría Primera A clubs
Categoría Primera B clubs
Unrelegated association football clubs